Pseudohynobius is a genus of salamanders in the family Hynobiidae and is endemic to China.  It contains these species:

Pseudohynobius flavomaculatus (Hu and Fei, 1978) (yellow-spotted salamander)
Pseudohynobius guizhouensis Li, Tian, and Gu, 2010 (Guizhou salamander)
Pseudohynobius jinfo Wei, Xiong, and Zeng, 2009 (Jinfo Mountain salamander)
Pseudohynobius kuankuoshuiensis Xu and Zeng, 2007 (Kuankuoshui salamander)
Pseudohynobius puxiongensis (Fei and Ye, 2000) (Puxiong salamander)
Pseudohynobius shuichengensis Tian, Gu, Li, Sun, and Li, 1998 (Shuicheng salamander)

References

 
Amphibians of Asia
Amphibian genera